'Martin McGrath may refer to:
Martin McGrath (Gaelic footballer), Irish Gaelic footballer
Marty McGrath (born 1984), former Australian rules football player
Martin McGrath (footballer, born 1960), English footballer
Martin McGrath (hurler) (born 1962), Irish hurler